Piestopleura is a genus of insects belonging to the family Platygastridae.

The genus has almost cosmopolitan distribution.

Species:
 Piestopleura abyssinica Buhl, 2004
 Piestopleura canariensis Buhl, 2005

References

Platygastridae
Hymenoptera genera